Huppert is a surname. Notable people with the surname include:

 Bertram Huppert (born 1927), German mathematician
 Boyd Huppert (born 1962), American TV journalist
 Dave Huppert (born 1957), baseball player
 Herbert Huppert (born 1943), geophysicist
 Isabelle Huppert (born 1953), French actress
 Jennifer Huppert (born 1962), Australian lawyer and politician
 Julian Huppert (born 1978), British scientist and politician

German-language surnames